The Citadel is a 1938 British drama film based on the 1937 novel of the same name by A. J. Cronin. The film was directed by King Vidor and produced by Victor Saville for Metro-Goldwyn-Mayer British at Denham Studios. It stars Robert Donat and Rosalind Russell.

Plot
Dr. Andrew Manson (Robert Donat) is an idealistic, newly qualified Scottish doctor dedicated to treating the Welsh miners suffering from tuberculosis in the Welsh mining village of Blaenely and is an apprentice to Dr. Page (Basil Gill). Initially, he has many lofty scientific goals, but meets local resistance in his research. After his laboratory and notes are destroyed by the miners, he moves to London, treating working-class patients in impoverished conditions. There, his purpose erodes when a chance encounter with a medical school friend, Dr. Frederick Lawford (Rex Harrison) leads to his quiet seduction by an unethical medical establishment, treating rich hypochondriacs. Christine (Rosalind Russell), his wife, tries to set him back on the original path. Dr. Philip Denny (Ralph Richardson), Manson's best friend and still working for improved working-class health, dies at the hands of an incompetent, social-climbing surgeon.

Differences from other versions
The film is based on the novel, but departs from it in certain vital respects. In the original text, the character of Christine Manson is killed off in a road accident at the point when she and her husband have begun to address problems in their relationship. The incident involving the incompetent surgeon occurs, but it is a minor character who dies. Denny survives, and the understanding (not related in the book but implied) is that he and Manson went into practice together. A 1982 BBC radio adaptation of the novel stays closer to the original text.

Cast
 Robert Donat as Dr. Andrew Manson
 Rosalind Russell as Christine Barlow
 Ralph Richardson as Dr. Philip Denny
 Rex Harrison as Dr. Frederick Lawford
 Emlyn Williams as Mr. Owen
 Penelope Dudley Ward as Toppy LeRoy
 Francis L. Sullivan as Ben Chenkin
 Mary Clare as Mrs. Orlando
 Cecil Parker as Charles Every
 Percy Parsons as Richard Stillman
 Basil Gill as Dr. Edward Page
 Dilys Davis as Blodwen Page
 Joss Ambler as Dr. Llewellyn
 Nora Swinburne as Mrs. Thornton
 Edward Chapman as Joe Morgan
 Athene Seyler as Lady Raebank
 Felix Aylmer as Mr. Boon
 Elliott Mason as District Nurse
 Joyce Bland as Nurse Sharp
 Eliot Makeham as Dai Jenkins
 D.J. Williams as Old Thomas
 Ruth Morgan as a worried family member (extra)

Awards
The film was nominated for Oscars in four categories: Best Picture, Best Actor (Robert Donat), Directing, and Adapted Screenplay.

The film won the Best Picture Award from both the New York Film Critics Circle and the National Board of Review. It is a New York Times Critics' Pick and is also listed in The New York Times Guide to the Best 1,000 Movies Ever Made.

Legacy
A Hindi-language film, Tere Mere Sapne, based on the A.J. Cronin novel, was released in 1971.

In February 2020, the film was shown at the 70th Berlin International Film Festival, as part of a retrospective dedicated to King Vidor's career.

References

External links 
 
 The Citadel at Turner Classic Movies (trailer)
 
 
 TCM article
 Britmovie website
 Variety review
 New York Times overview
 Literature, Arts, and Medicine Database entry
 
 
 
 British Film Institute: The Ultimate Film List
 Article about Cronin and the NHS
Streaming audio
 The Citadel on Campbell Playhouse: 21 January 1940
 The Citadel on Theater of Romance: 20 March 1945
 BBC Wales Arts article

1938 films
British black-and-white films
Films shot at Denham Film Studios
1930s English-language films
Films based on British novels
Films directed by King Vidor
Films set in Wales
Films set in London
Films set in the 1920s
Films set in the 1930s
Medical-themed films
Metro-Goldwyn-Mayer films
Films shot in England
Films about medical malpractice
Films based on works by A. J. Cronin
National Health Service
Compositions by Charles Williams
1938 romantic drama films
British romantic drama films
Films with screenplays by Ian Dalrymple
Films produced by Victor Saville
Films about tuberculosis
Medical ethics in fiction
1930s British films